Slavko Bralić (born 15 December 1992) is a Croatian professional footballer playing as a defender for Osijek in the 1. HNL.

Club career
On 15 June 2018, Bralić signed a one-year contract with Neftçi. On 15 January 2019, after 13 games for Neftçi, Bralić was demoted to Neftçi-2 after being told to find a new club. Bralić was released from his Neftçi contract on 30 January 2019 by mutual consent. On January 31, 2019, Bralic signed a 2.5-year contract with Greek Super League club Athlitiki Enosi Larissa After half a season in Greece, on February 7, 2020, Bralic signed a 1.5-year contract with Serbian SuperLiga club Vojvodina from Novi Sad. On 1 June 2021, Bralic signed a 3-year contract with Croatian First Football League club NK Osijek.

Honours

Club
Solin
 2. HNL runners-up: 2012–13
Široki Brijeg
 BiH Football Cup: 2016–17
Vojvodina
 Serbian Cup: 2019–20

References

1992 births
Living people
Footballers from Split, Croatia
Association football defenders
Croatian footballers
NK Solin players
NK Osijek players
NK Široki Brijeg players
Neftçi PFK players
Athlitiki Enosi Larissa F.C. players
FK Vojvodina players
First Football League (Croatia) players
Croatian Football League players
Premier League of Bosnia and Herzegovina players
Azerbaijan Premier League players
Super League Greece players
Serbian SuperLiga players
Croatian expatriate footballers
Expatriate footballers in Bosnia and Herzegovina
Croatian expatriate sportspeople in Bosnia and Herzegovina
Expatriate footballers in Azerbaijan
Croatian expatriate sportspeople in Azerbaijan
Expatriate footballers in Greece
Croatian expatriate sportspeople in Greece
Expatriate footballers in Serbia
Croatian expatriate sportspeople in Serbia